Kolbad District is a district (bakhsh) in Galugah County, Mazandaran Province, Iran. At the 2006 census, its population was 12,756, in 3,339 families.  The District has no cities. The District has two rural districts (dehestan): Kolbad-e Gharbi Rural District and Kolbad-e Sharqi Rural District.

References 

Galugah County
Districts of Mazandaran Province